The Irish National Heritage Park is an open-air museum near Wexford which tells the story of human settlement in Ireland from the Mesolithic period right up to the Norman Invasion in 1169. It has 16 reconstructed dwellings including a mesolithic camp, a neolithic farmstead, a portal dolmen, a cyst grave, stone circle, medieval ringfort, monastic site, crannóg and a Viking harbour. It opened in 1987 and opens 363 days of the year to the public. It covers 13.7 hectares of parkland, estuary trails and wetland forest. It is a not for profit organisation and all its receipts from admissions, restaurant and shop sales go directly back into the running and maintenance of the park.

The park offers guided tours led by costumed guides, have audio guides available or self guiding options. The guided tour lasts about one and a half hours and ends at the Viking harbour. The park also contains a restaurant and a gift shop. The Trials of Tuan are a set of fun activities throughout the park for children to enjoy culminating in panning for gold.

Facilities
The park has ample free parking, outside toilets as well as toilets in the restaurant and public toilets within the park itself. Full baby changing facilities are available. There are several standard assisted toilets as well as a "Changing Places" facility, which provides 12m² of floor space, and includes both a full room coverage ceiling track hoist, a centrally located toilet bowl with space either side for transfers or assistants, and a height-adjustable adult sized changing bench.

Courses and events 
The park runs an array of courses throughout the year ranging from blacksmithing and wood carving to stone masonry and mounted combat, as well as many events throughout the year. The park is dedicated to bringing traditional skills back to the public and making them accessible to as many people as possible.

Carrig, digging the lost town 
The newest addition to the park is an archaeological excavation at the site of the first Norman fortification in Ireland on the hill of Carrig overlooking the river Slaney. The park partnered with the IAFS (Irish Archaeology Field School) to excavate and research the site proving studying opportunities for international students from all over the world. The site contains a ringwork, burnt wooden structure and later stone castle. A town grew up around the castle and existed till the 1300s.

References

External links
 
 Heritage park's Youtube channel

Open-air museums in the Republic of Ireland
Museums in County Wexford